Iraq consists of 19 governorates, also known as "provinces". Per the Iraqi constitution, governorates can form an autonomous region. Four governorates, Erbil, Sulaymaniyah, Duhok, and Halabja, constitute the autonomous Kurdistan Region. Baghdad (which is the most populous) and Basra are the oldest standing provinces of Iraq.  The second most-populous province, Ninawa (also called Nineveh) is in the upland and quite cool climate of the north-west.

Through early 2014, the Council of Ministers of the government of Iraq approved proposals to add the three newest governorates:
Tal Afar, from part of Ninawa Governorate 
Tuz Khurmatu, from part of Saladin Governorate
Halabja from part of the Sulaymaniyah Governorate.

Another proposal exists to add a 20th: Fallujah, from the relevant part of the Al Anbar. This largely did not occur due to the ISIS insurgency. Following the defeat of ISIS in the Battle of Fallujah (2016), the proposal may resurface or Al-Anbar may remain undivided.

Governorates

Former governorates

Kuwait was annexed by Iraq in 1990 and then became Kuwait Governorate (1990–1991)

See also
 Districts of Iraq
 ISO 3166-2:IQ
 List of Governorates of Iraq by Human Development Index
 List of places in Iraq

References

 
Governorates, Iraq
Iraq geography-related lists
Iraq, Provinces
Iraq 1

bg:Административно деление на Ирак
pl:Podział administracyjny Iraku
ru:Административное деление Ирака